Torpedoman's Mate (abbreviated as TM) is a United States Navy occupational rating. It was disestablished on submarines in 1995 and on surface ships on 1 October 2007. Surface torpedomen were merged into the gunner's mate rating, while submarine torpedomen were merged into the machinist's mate (non-nuclear) rating, becoming MM(W) or machinist mates (weapons). It was re-established on 30 September 2019 via NAVADMIN 225/19. The TM rating badge will be the same one in use when the rating was disestablished in 1995.

The re-establishment of the rate is in direct support of the Sailor 2025 and Rating Modernization initiative, which aim to empower Sailors and expand professional development opportunities.

A torpedoman's mate:

 Torpedomen perform organizational and intermediate level maintenance on underwater ordnance
 Handle torpedoes and antisubmarine rockets (ASROC) launched from surface ships, submarines, and aircraft, as well as missiles (Tomahawk/Harpoon), decoys, and countermeasures launched from submarines
 Originally loaded Polaris and Poseidon missiles aboard Fleet Ballistic Missile submarines; in port and underway, maintained and operated the missile launch tubes and their associated pneumatic/hydraulic/electrical systems. These functions have been taken over by Missile Technicians for the Trident missile.
 Operate and maintain test equipment, launching/firing systems, and stowage facilities associated with underwater ordnance
 Prepare underwater ordnance for launching, conduct postfire/post-run routines, and weapons performance evaluation procedures
 Maintain and operate the anchor on board submarines
 Maintain, issue, and conduct training for small arms and act as subject matter experts in force protection on board submarines

References

See also
List of United States Navy ratings

United States Navy
United States Navy ratings